The 1996 Arizona State Sun Devils football team represented the Arizona State University in the 1996 NCAA Division I-A college football season. The team's head coach was Bruce Snyder, who was coaching his fifth season with the Sun Devils and 17th season overall. Home games were played at Sun Devil Stadium in Tempe, Arizona. They participated as members of the Pacific-10 Conference.

Regular season
In 1996, the Sun Devils went a surprising 11–1, highlighted by a 19–0 shutout of the number-one-ranked, two-time defending national champion, Nebraska Cornhuskers in Tempe, ending Nebraska's 26-game win streak.  The upset win also gained a measure of revenge from the previous season, when they went into Lincoln and were not only defeated by a 77–28 margin, but were enraged after the eventual national champions threw a long touchdown pass in the game's final minutes. ASU quarterback Jake Plummer led the Sun Devils, propelling Arizona State into the Rose Bowl against the Ohio State Buckeyes. Had the Sun Devils won, they would have had a very good chance of winning at least a share of the national championship, as they would have been the only undefeated major-college team in the nation. The Sun Devils led 17–14 with 1:47 left in the fourth quarter, but surrendered a late touchdown to Ohio State, falling by a final score of 20–17. As it turned out, Florida State lost in the Sugar Bowl to the Florida Gators; had the Sun Devils won, they would have had a perfect 12–0 record while the Gators would have finished with one regular season loss (to the Seminoles).

Schedule
The Sun Devils finished the season with an 11–1 record.

Roster

Rankings

Game summaries

Washington

North Texas

Nebraska

Oregon

Boise State

at UCLA

USC

at Stanford

at Oregon State

California

at Arizona

Bruce Snyder's 100th career win
Terry Battle passes 1,000 yards rushing for the season (ASU – 450 rush yards)

vs. Ohio State (Rose Bowl)

Awards and honors
Jake Plummer – Pac-10 Offensive Player of the Year, Third in Heisman Trophy balloting
Bruce Snyder – Paul "Bear" Bryant Award

1996 Team Players in the NFL
The following players were claimed in the 1997 NFL Draft.

References

Arizona State
Arizona State Sun Devils football seasons
Pac-12 Conference football champion seasons
Arizona State Sun Devils football